Gulnazar Keldi (20 September 1945 – 13 August 2020) was a Tajikistani poet from Dardar and editor of the publication Adabiyet va sanat (Literature and Art). Keldi wrote the lyrics of "Surudi Milli", the national anthem of Tajikistan. 

He died from COVID-19 during the COVID-19 pandemic in Tajikistan. Buried at the Luchob cemetery in Dushanbe.

References

1945 births
2020 deaths
20th-century Tajikistani poets
Persian-language poets
National anthem writers
Male poets
20th-century male writers
Tajikistani male writers
People from Sughd Region
Deaths from the COVID-19 pandemic in Tajikistan